Sentinel Falls can mean one of two waterfalls:
Sentinel Falls (Montana)
The unofficial name of Sentinel Fall in Yosemite National Park